The Zweihänder (German 'two-hander'), also Doppelhänder ('double-hander'), Beidhänder ('both-hander'), Bihänder or Bidenhänder, is a large two-handed sword primarily in use during the 16th century.

Zweihänder swords developed from the longswords of the Late Middle Ages and became the hallmark weapon of the German Landsknechte from the time of Maximilian I (d. 1519) and during the Italian Wars of 1494–1559. The Goliath Fechtbuch (1510) shows an intermediate form between longsword and Zweihänder.

These swords represent the final stage in the trend of increasing size that started in the 14th century. In its developed form, the Zweihänder acquired the characteristics of a polearm rather than a sword due to their large size and weight and therefore increased range and striking power. Consequently, it was not carried in a sheath but across the shoulder like a halberd.

By the second half of the 16th century, these swords had largely ceased to have a practical application, but they continued to see ceremonial or representative use well into the 17th century.

Morphology
Zweihänders above  were confined to ceremonial use.

Early Zweihänders were simply larger versions of longswords. Later examples had Parierhaken ("parrying hooks") at the top of the ricasso as well as side rings on the hilt. Swords continued to be made without one or both features. Some Zweihänders had wavy blades and were called Flammenschwert.

Application

The weapon is mostly associated with either Swiss or German mercenaries known as Landsknechte, and their wielders were known as Doppelsöldner. However, the Swiss outlawed their use, while the Landsknechte kept using them until much later. The Black Band of German mercenaries (active during the 1510s and 1520s) included 2,000 two-handed swordsmen in a total strength of 17,000 men. Zweihänder-wielders fought with and against pike formations. Soldiers trained in the use of the sword were granted the title of Meister des langen Schwertes (lit. Master of the Long Sword) by the Mark Brotherhood.

Frisian hero Pier Gerlofs Donia is reputed to have wielded a Zweihänder with such skill, strength and efficiency that he managed to behead several people with it in a single blow. The Zweihänder ascribed to him is, as of 2008, on display in the Fries Museum.

Modernity

Some modern historical European martial arts groups, specifically ones focusing on the German longsword styles, use some Zweihänders with less pronounced Parierhaken for training and tournament purposes. These less pronounced parrying hooks are sometimes colloquially referred to as "Schilden," or literally "shields" in German, as they are used to catch incoming opposing blades. These Schilden often also act as ricassos by smoothing out, and thickening, after the blade-catchers have been passed. These are specifically the Zweihänders called feders, or federn in German, and are historically training weapons; there is no concrete evidence suggesting wooden longswords were ever actually used, even for training purposes. Even today, most modern training weapons are metal, as wood does not have as much give under blade pressure as real steel, although some synthetic plastic weapons are used for cost-efficiency. Additionally, some modern adjustments to certain weapons extend the crossguards of the blades; this is in part because certain HEMA schools follow manuscripts pertaining to Kreutz attacks – i.e., attacks performed with one's crossguard, specifically, and some persons also choose to use their Zweihänders as rapiers, so a basket hilt may be designed atop this extension.

See also
 Claymore
 Great sword
 Ōdachi

References

External links

 Essay by Anthony Shore (Journal of Western Martial Art)
 The Weighty Issue of Two-Handed Greatswords, by John Clements

Renaissance-era swords
German words and phrases